Maria Roberta "Beba" Schranz (born 22 December 1952) is a former Italian alpine skier.

Career
During her career she has achieved 5 results among the top 10 in the World Cup and participated for the Italy Alpine Ski Team at the FIS Alpine World Ski Championships 1970.

World Cup results
Top 10

References

External links
 
 

1952 births
Living people
Italian female alpine skiers